"Coming Home Soldier" is a song co-written and sung by Bobby Vinton, which he released in 1966. The song is a sequel to Vinton's previous hit "Mr. Lonely," sung from the perspective of a man who is returning home to the girl he loves, after having fought in a war overseas, and has survived without serious injury ("no Purple Heart"). The song spent 12 weeks on the Billboard Hot 100 chart, peaking at No. 11, while reaching No. 29 on Canada's CHUM Hit Parade, and No. 89 on Canada's RPM 100.

Chart performance

References

Songs about soldiers
Songs about the military
1966 songs
1966 singles
Bobby Vinton songs
Epic Records singles
Songs written by Bobby Vinton